Ləzran (also, Lyazan) is a village and the least populous municipality in the Yardymli Rayon of Azerbaijan.  It has a population of 137.  The municipality consists of the villages of Ləzran and Eçara.

References 

Populated places in Yardimli District